Circuital is the sixth studio album by American rock band My Morning Jacket. It was released on May 31, 2011.

The album received mainly positive reviews and sold 55,000 copies in the first week of release. It debuted at number 5 on the Billboard 200, improving on the band's previous highest debuting album Evil Urges, which entered the chart at number 9. This album peaked #1 on the independent albums chart,#3 on the rock albums, and #3 on the alternative albums charts.  The album has sold 208,000 copies in the US as of April 2015.

The album was also released as a double 12" 45 RPM vinyl set and as a deluxe vinyl edition. As promotion for the album, the band gave away one free download per week for six weeks until April 12. The first five tracks were recorded during their shows at New York’s Terminal 5 in October 2010, while the final download was the new album's title track.

Songs
All tracks were recorded in the band's hometown of Louisville, Kentucky in a church gymnasium with producer Tucker Martine. The album was mixed at Blackbird Studio in Nashville, Tennessee. Music site Antiquiet stated the main themes of Circuital deal with "growing older and wiser, but with a respect for past experiences." "Victory Dance" was brought on by Jim James' experience with Lasik surgery before the sessions for Circuital. The day after surgery, James began to play his Wurlitzer keyboard and reflected on the surgery. The lyrics, "Should I close my eyes and prophesize?" are taken from the surgery.

The title track was recorded on the band's second attempt. James explained to UK newspaper The Sun that the song is about the circular nature of life. Originally conceived as a Muppets song for Dr. Teeth and the Electric Mayhem, the song was to be performed by My Morning Jacket live with the Muppets on stage with the band behind a curtain, playing live. However, when the Muppets project was disbanded, the song was recorded for Circuital. "Outta My System" was also to be part of the failed Muppets tour. The song is about a man looking back on his reckless youth and, despite some risky life choices, the man is glad he did all those things and to be able to "get it outta my system." On the origins of "Holdin' On to Black Metal," bassist Tom Blankenship stated to IFC that it deals with holding on to something that you loved as a child that helped you cope with growing up. He went on to say: "How difficult would adolescence have been without the music that helped carry us through it? No one enters adulthood feeling none of the emotions they did when they were sixteen." The song contains an all female choir, consisting of friends of the band.

The songs "Wonderful" and "Outta My System" were originally written by Jim James for Dr. Teeth and the Electric Mayhem to perform in the 2011 film The Muppets and a subsequent tour, but these were left unused after the executive who hired him was fired.  Of the turn of events James said: "So now, twice, Muppet glory has been within my grasp...it's pretty heartbreaking, but it did propel us just to kick into high gear and finish our own record."

Album cover
The album cover is a close-up shot of a Magic eye tube fitted onto vintage radio receivers from the 1930s. The purpose of tuning eyes in these radio sets was to help tune a station in at its strongest point on the dial. So when the perfect frequency was found, the Magic Tuning Eye would be lit up all the way (like the album cover's). The percentage of light shown signified the strength of the signal. As mentioned to Rolling Stone magazine by James, the album cover depicting the Magic eye tube was inspired by his own experience of getting Lasik eye surgery, saying: "The whole experience of it is so fucked up, it's somebody slicing your eyeball open and shooting you with a laser." It also inspired James to write the song "Victory Dance."

Critical reception

Uncut placed the album at number 35 on its list of "Top 50 albums of 2011". It was also named the 9th best album by Clash Magazine, the third best by Paste and KCRW music director as well as 6th on The Record Exchange's best of 2011 lists and the 11th best by Rolling Stone. It also was named 14th best album of 2011 by American Songwriter, honorable mention by Glide, 78th best by Popmatters, and 20th best by Mojo.

On November 30, 2011, the album received a nomination in the 54th Grammy Awards for Best Alternative Music Album.

Track listing

Note: "Holdin' On to Black Metal" includes portions of "E-Saew Tam Punha Huajai (Advice Column for Love Troubles Part I)", written by Kwan Jai & Kwan Jit Sriprajan. James used the song as a loop to record the demo. The band subsequently used the loop as a guide when recording the final track.

On the LP version of Circuital, the intro to "The Day Is Coming" varies slightly and seems a couple seconds longer than the other released formats.

Personnel
My Morning Jacket
Tom Blankenship – bass guitar
Carl Broemel – guitar, vocals, pedal steel, saxophone, horn arrangements
Patrick Hallahan – drums, percussion
Jim James – vocals, guitar, keyboards
Bo Koster – keyboards, vocals, synthesizers, pianos, organs, glockenspiel, percussion

Additional musicians
Black Metal Girls – group backing vocals (track 6)
Chris Gregg – alto saxophone, baritone saxophone
Jeremy Kittel – violin, viola
Leif Shires – trumpet, flugelhorn
Ben Sollee – cello
Oscar Utterstrom – trombone, euphonium

Charts

Weekly charts

Year-end charts

References

External links
 

2011 albums
My Morning Jacket albums
Rough Trade Records albums
EMI Records albums
ATO Records albums
Albums produced by Tucker Martine
Albums produced by Jim James